Redimus (Latin for We Return) is the fourth studio album by British symphonic black metal band Hecate Enthroned. It was released on 3 May 2004 by Blackend Records. It was their last album to be released by Blackend, as well as their last one to feature Dean Seddon on vocals and Rob Kendrick on drums. It was also their first release to feature Pete White on the keyboards.

Redimus continues along the sound originally heard on Kings of Chaos, with death metal-style guitars, tempos and growls mixed with symphonic black metal keyboards, melodies and grim screaming. There are also elements of progressive tendencies, as evidenced in the title track and "Morbeea", an acoustic track heavily influenced by Spanish flamenco music.

Jason Mendonça of Akercocke fame guest-stars on the track "An Eternal Belief".

The drawing used as the album's cover is "Saint Michael Fighting the Dragon", an engraving by Albrecht Dürer.

Track listing

Personnel
 Hecate Enthroned
 Dean Seddon — vocals
 Andy Milnes — guitar
 Rob Kendrick — drums, percussion
 Dylan Hughes — bass guitar
 Pete White — keyboards
 Nigel Dennen — guitar

 Guest musicians
 Jason Mendonça — backing vocals on "An Eternal Belief"

 Miscellaneous staff
 Phil Green — engineering, production, mixing

References

External links 
 Redimus at Encyclopaedia Metallum

Hecate Enthroned albums
2004 albums